Mexican Highways are composed of two groups:
 Mexican Federal Highways - Built and maintained by the SCT.
 State Highways - Built and maintained by the state it's in.

Shield list

Federal Highways
 Mexican Federal Highways
See: Mexican Federal Highway 85

 Tolled Mexican Federal Highways
See: Mexican Federal Highway 1D

State Highways
Nuevo Leon State Highway 1 Spur
Nuevo Leon State Highway 58
Durango state highways
List of highways in Sonora
Jalisco State Highway 225
Sinaloa State Highway 1D
Tamaulipas State Highway 1

References

Roads in Mexico